CKBL-FM (92.9 FM, "92.9 The Bull") is a radio station in Saskatoon, Saskatchewan. Owned by 629112 Saskatchewan Ltd. trading as Saskatoon Media Group, it broadcasts a country music format.

History
The station originated on the AM dial as CFQC, which began broadcasting in 1923. It was founded by electrical supply shop owners A. A. "Pappy" Murphy and David Streb. Murphy bought out Streb in 1932.

The station was an affiliate of the Canadian Radio Broadcasting Commission from 1933 to 1936 when it affiliated with the newly formed Canadian Broadcasting Corporation. It lost that affiliation in 1939 when the CBC signed on CBK as its outlet for all of southern and central Saskatchewan. In 1944 it became an affiliate of the CBC's Dominion Network until 1962 when the network was reabsorbed into the main CBC Radio network and CFQC became independent. In 1954, CFQC-TV was established by the Murphy family and became Saskatoon's first television station; initially a CBC affiliate, in the early 1970s it switched to the CTV Television Network. Both the TV and radio stations shared some on-air personnel such as newsreaders.

Pappy Murphy died in 1959. His family sold CFQC-AM and TV to Baton Broadcasting in 1972, earning a handsome return on its original investment of 49 years earlier. Baton exited radio in 1991, selling CFQC to George Gallagher, at which point the radio station's ties to its TV namesake all but ended. However, only two years later, Gallagher was forced into receivership. Clint Forster, owner of CJWW, bought CFQC in 1994 and announced plans to move it to the FM band.

On February 6, 1995, at 6:06 a.m., CFQC left its longtime AM position at 600 and was replaced by CJWW, which moved from 750 AM. The last song played on "Hits 600" was "Stand Tall" by Burton Cummings.

At 7:00am that day, CFQC-FM signed on at 92.9 FM, where it was rebranded Hot 93 and switched from adult contemporary to country, complementing CJWW's classic country format. Current owner Elmer Hildebrand bought the station in 2001. CFQC and its brand were retired at 6:00am November 1, 2007. The final song played under the old call letters at 5:58am was Michelle Wright's version of "Rock Me Gently", ending an 84-year era (though the TV station would officially continue using "CFQC", although its on-air branding by this time had become CTV Saskatoon). At 7:00am, the station changed its call letters to CKBL-FM and its branding to 92.9 The Bull. The first song played under the new callsign was Big & Rich's "Save a Horse, Ride a Cowboy". It also adopted a New Country format under the direction of program director and morning show co-host Steve "Hurricane" Huber.

In January 2020, the station announced that it would give equal airplay to female musicians.

References

External links
 92.9 The Bull
 
 

KBL
KBL
Radio stations established in 1923
1923 establishments in Saskatchewan
KBL
CNR Radio
Canadian Radio Broadcasting Commission